Michael Holt (born 28 July 1977) is a footballer who last played for West Lancashire Football League side Barnoldswick Town. He played as a striker.

He previously played in The Football League for Blackburn Rovers, Preston North End, Macclesfield Town and Rochdale and in non-league football with Northwich Victoria and Nelson. He also had a five-year spell in Ireland with League of Ireland sides St Patrick's Athletic and Derry City.

In the 2005–06 season, he scored 36 goals in all competitions for Nelson, helping them to win promotion to the North West Counties Football League Division One. However, in August 2006, he decided to leave the Blues to join his hometown club, Barnoldswick Town. He is reported to have joined Barnoldswick whilst the then Nelson manager, Graham Haworth, was on holiday.

Michael Holt is now a serving Police Officer with the Lancashire Constabulary.  

1977 births
English footballers
Association football forwards
Blackburn Rovers F.C. players
Preston North End F.C. players
Macclesfield Town F.C. players
Rochdale A.F.C. players
Northwich Victoria F.C. players
Derry City F.C. players
St Patrick's Athletic F.C. players
League of Ireland players
Nelson F.C. players
Living people
People from Barnoldswick
Barnoldswick Town F.C. players
Footballers from Yorkshire
Expatriate association footballers in the Republic of Ireland